Taliban militants, wearing Afghan army uniform, stormed a prison outside the city of Ghazni on 14 September 2015, freeing more than 355 inmates (out of 436 housed at the prison). At least 148 of the escapees are considered to be a serious threat to national security. According to the Ministry of Interior, of those escape, 148 had been jailed for attacks on security forces, while 207 had been convicted for other crimes. Only three prisoners had been recaptured.

Raid

Gunmen and three suicide bombers attacked the prison early in the morning of 14 September 2015. A Taliban spokesperson said that the group had carried out the attack and said that there were gunmen and three suicide bombers involved in the attack.

Outcome
At least four police guards were killed and seven others were wounded, and three Taliban fighters were also killed in the early morning battle. The interior ministry stated that 355 of the prison's 436 inmates escaped. Most were charged with crimes against national security and other criminal offences.

Responsibility of the attack

Taliban spokesman Zabihullah Mujahid assumed the responsibility for the attacks.

See also 
 Sarposa prison attack of 2008
 Sarposa prison tunneling escape of 2011

References

 
2015 murders in Afghanistan
Prison escape
21st-century mass murder in Afghanistan
Attacks on buildings and structures in Afghanistan
Battles of the War in Afghanistan (2001–2021)
Mass murder in 2015
Prison raids
September 2015 crimes in Asia
September 2015 events in Afghanistan
Suicide bombings in 2015
Suicide bombings in Afghanistan 
Taliban bombings
Terrorist incidents in Afghanistan in 2015
Attacks in Afghanistan in 2015